Mykolas Biržiška (24 August 1882, in Viekšniai – 24 August 1962, in Los Angeles), a Lithuanian editor, historian, professor of literature, diplomat, and politician, was one of the twenty signatories of the Act of Independence of Lithuania.

Biography
Born in a noble Lithuanian family Biržiška was twice expelled from the Gymnasium in Šiauliai after refusing to attend Orthodox services, and after organising a Lithuanian evening, although later was allowed to finish the studies.

He graduated from law school at the University of Moscow in 1907. He was arrested at a student meeting in 1902 for advocating Lithuanian causes and served part of a two-year sentence, but succeeded in regaining admission to the university. After returning to Vilnius, he became involved in the independence movement, frequently contributing articles to periodicals and later working with the War Relief Committee. at the time he was also working as assistant of Tadeusz Wróblewski. In 1915 he became principal of the first Lithuanian high school in Vilnius.

Together with his fellows he wrote a letter for US President Woodrow Wilson asking for support for Independence of Lithuania.

In 1918 he was elected a member of the Council of Lithuania, and signed the Act in 1918. He served briefly as Minister of Education in the Second Cabinet of Ministers, and was busy preparing to reopen Vilnius University.

On 31 January 1920, Mykolas Biržiška wrote in Lietuvos aidas:the issue of belonging to a certain nationality is not decided by everyone at will, it is not a matter that can be resolved according to the principles of political liberalism, even one cloaked in democratic slogans.During the events that preceded the Polish occupation of Vilnius in 1920, Biržiška acted as a negotiator. In summer 1921 he landed in court for an article in newspaper "Straż Litwy", and was defended by attorney Tadeusz Wróblewski. He was one of 32 Lithuanians arrested in January 1922 and expelled formally a month later by decision of Aleksander Meysztowicz, president of Central Lithuania provisional government, from Vilnius and handed over to Lithuanian army.

He moved to Kaunas, the temporary capital, where he became a professor of literature at University of Lithuania. While a professor, he was an editor of the Lithuanian Encyclopedia, and participated in a number of social and cultural organizations. He became founder and chairman of the Union for the Liberation of Vilnius. Biržiška then served as rector of Vilnius University from 1940 to March 1943, and in autumn 1944.

After the second Soviet occupation in 1944, Biržiška went to West Germany, and was a professor at the Baltic University in Hamburg and Pinneberg. He moved to the United States in 1949. He pursued his earliest interests, folklore and folk dance, until his death in 1962.

Family 
Biržiška belonged to an eminent noble family. His grandfather Leonardas Biržiška was an active participant in the 1839-1831 Uprising; and his brothers, Vaclovas Biržiška and Viktoras Biržiška, were also leaders of the Lithuanian community. His father, the physician Antanas Biržiška, declined a professorship at the University of Moscow to practice medicine in the rural areas of Lithuania.

He had two daughters Marija Biržiškaite and Ona Biržiškaitė Barauskienė and three grandchildren.

Selected bibliography 
 Lietuvių dainų literatūros istorija, 1919.
 Mūsų raštų istorija. 1547-1904, expanded later to "Mūsų raštų istorja (nuo 16 a. iki 1864) (1925).
 Dainos kelias,1921.
 Barono gyvenimas ir raštai, 1924.
 Duonelaičio gyvenimas ir raštai, 1927.
 Rinktiniai mūsų senovės raštai, 1927.
 Together with his brother Vaclovas he prepared and published a work by Simonas Daukantas, Darbai senųjų lietuvių ir žemaičių, 1929.
 Aleksandrynas, 3 vol. (1960-1965) Bibliography of Lithuanian writers up to 1865. Primarily Vaclovas' work, but Mykolas served as collaborator and editor after Vaclovas' death in 1956.
 Anuo metu Viekšniuose ir Šiauliuose (memoirs).
 Lietuvių tautos Kelias 2 vol. written in exile in Los Angeles, 1952

Notes

Sources

References
 "Biržiška, Mykolas". Encyclopedia Lituanica I: 364:365. (1970–1978). Ed. Simas Sužiedėlis. Boston, Massachusetts: Juozas Kapočius. LCCN 74-114275.
 Biography at Lituanus magazine.
 Biography at Lietuvos Seimas website (in Lithuanian)

1882 births
1962 deaths
People from Viekšniai
People from Shavelsky Uyezd
19th-century Lithuanian nobility
20th-century Lithuanian nobility
Ministers of Education of Lithuania
Members of the Council of Lithuania
Lithuanian male writers
20th-century Lithuanian historians
Lithuanian literary historians
Lithuanian encyclopedists
Lithuanian independence activists
Lithuanian ethnographers
Lithuanian emigrants to the United States
Moscow State University alumni
Rectors of Vilnius University
Rectors of Vytautas Magnus University
Lithuanian writers in Polish